Platycheirus hyperboreus is a species of syrphid fly in the family Syrphidae. It is found in Europe.

References

Syrphinae
Articles created by Qbugbot
Insects described in 1845
Taxa named by Frank Montgomery Hull